Juan León Mera Martínez (28 June 1832 – 13 December 1894) was an Ecuadorian essayist, novelist, politician and painter.  His best-known works are the Ecuadorian National Hymn and the novel Cumandá (1879). Additionally, in his political career, he was a functionary of president Gabriel García Moreno.

Biography 

He was born in Ambato on 28 June 1832 and died in the same city on 13 December 1894. His father, Pedro Antonio Mera Gómez was a businessman while his mother Josefa Martínez Vásconez, raised her only son alone due to the fact that he abandoned her during her pregnancy.
His infancy was humble while during his first years of life he lived at the “Los Molinos” country property, located in Ambato.  In order to support the family his maternal grandmother rented the property to her brother Pablo Vásconez, who was a political activist who fought against the politics of Juan José Flores. León Mera received his education at home, which in large part was carried out by great-uncle as well as his uncle Nicolás Martínez who was a doctor.
At the age of twenty he traveled to Quito to study painting with the noted pictural artist Antonio Salas, where he learned how to paint oil and watercolor. At the age of 33, he and Antonio Neumane created the Ecuadorian National Hymn, "salve, Oh patria".
Juan Leon Mera's son José Trajano Mera (1862 – 1919) became a poet, playwright and diplomat,

Writing 

In the year 1854, he published his first verses of poetry in the newspaper La Democracia, with the help of writer Miguel Riofrío.
He founded the Ecuadorian Academy of language in 1874 and was a member of the Real Academia Española.

He is considered one of the precursors of Ecuadorian literature for his famous national novel Cumandá which shows the complicated racial and social intricacies of Ecuador following independence. It was published in Quito in the year 1879 and later in Madrid in 1891.  This novel was later utilized by Ecuadorian dramaturgists of the 20th century Luis H. Salgado (1903–1977), Pedro Pablo Traversari Salazar (1874–1956) and Sixto María Durán Cárdenas (1875–1947) to each write an opera.

Political career 
In addition to being a writer and painter he was a political conservative and follower of Gabriel García Moreno. He was the governor of Cotopaxi, Secretary of the Council of State, Senator, President of the Senate and National Congress in 1886.
His former residence, the museum "La quinta de Juan León Mera", in the city of Ambato, exhibits his possessions.

Works

References

Works based on his novels 

Three operas have been based on Juan León Mera's novel Cumandá:
 * Cumandá, una ópera de Luis H. Salgado
 * Cumandá, una ópera de Sixto María Durán Cárdenas
 * Cumandá o la virgen de las selvas una ópera de Pedro Pablo Traversari Salazar

1832 births
1894 deaths
People from Ambato, Ecuador
Presidents of the Senate of Ecuador
Ecuadorian painters
Ecuadorian male writers
Members of the Royal Spanish Academy
National anthem writers
19th-century Ecuadorian painters